Cahuenga Boulevard is a major boulevard of northern Los Angeles, California, US. The “Cahuenga” name is a Spanish, phonetic derivative with no actual Spanish language meaning that is attributed to the Tongva village of Kawengna, meaning "place of the mountain". It connects Sunset Boulevard in the heart of old Hollywood to the Hollywood Hills and North Hollywood in the San Fernando Valley.

Description
Cahuenga Boulevard begins at West Victory Boulevard in North Hollywood, crosses the Ventura Freeway and the Los Angeles River as it temporarily merges with Lankershim Boulevard before passing the Campo de Cahuenga and Universal City Metro station, then crosses the Hollywood Freeway. At this point an intersection is formed with Ventura Boulevard to the northwest and the continuation of Cahuenga Boulevard to the southeast. From here it parallels the Hollywood Freeway, passing The Baked Potato jazz club.
and Universal Studios Hollywood (as Cahuenga Boulevard West), rising over the Cahuenga Pass connecting the San Fernando Valley to the Los Angeles Basin. Crossing the freeway once again on the Pilgrimage Bridge near The Hollywood Bowl, it continues (as North Cahuenga Boulevard) down to Sunset Boulevard and Melrose Avenue in downtown Hollywood. The boulevard is one of the principal routes to Universal Studios from downtown Los Angeles.

Landmarks

The southern part of Cahuenga Boulevard has been referred to as the "heart of old Hollywood". The intersection between Cahuenga and Hollywood Boulevards had been an important intersection from the early history of Los Angeles, and by 1915 it already had a trolley stop, a bank and a hardware store. Trolley cars were used on the boulevards until the 1960s when replaced with bus. Historically a number of important Los Angeles buildings were located on the road including the Technicolor building from the 1940s through the 1960s and the World Book and News building. The Owl Drug Company at 6380–84 Hollywood Boulevard on the south-west corner of Cahuenga Boulevard was a notable Californian company in the 1930s. At the intersection of Cahuenga Boulevard with Yucca Street, just off of Hollywood Boulevard was the Halifax Hotel, owned by world-famous classical pianist Van Cliburn.

The Buster Keaton studio, originally belonging to Charlie Chaplin, was located on Lillian Way, one block east of the boulevard. The boulevard appears in several of his films. 1542 Cahuenga Boulevard, which formerly adjoined the Toribuchi Grocery at 1546, appeared in the 1921 Keaton film The Goat, which featured Keaton running from the police past them. It is now a strip mall. In another Keaton film, Three Ages (1923), Keaton is seen running from the police past the Los Angeles Police Department Hollywood building and former fire station, now the location of Edmonds Tower at 1629.

Today, numerous nightclubs, bars, and restaurants are dotted along the boulevard south of Franklin Avenue. Notable clubs on Cahuenga include The Room, Hotel Café, Velvet Margarita, and many others.  The Hotel Café, at 1623 1/2 N. Cahuenga Blvd, is owned by Marko Shafer and Maximillian Mamikunian and opened in 2000. The Baked Potato, one of the city's most prominent jazz clubs, is situated near the intersection with the Hollywood Freeway, and the Hollywood Theatre of Note is also on the boulevard. At 1355 North Cahuenga Boulevard is the Los Angeles Fire Department Museum and Memorial, a Los Angeles Historic-Cultural Monument and National Register of Historic Places building which was built in the Neo-Renaissance style in 1930.

References

External links

Builders Of The Broad Highway Film showing Cahuenga Parkway c1940 construction (~4:22 onwards)
LAistory: Pilgrimage Bridge Cahuenga Parkway completion details

Streets in Los Angeles
Streets in the San Fernando Valley
Streets in Hollywood, Los Angeles
North Hollywood, Los Angeles
Studio City, Los Angeles